The Tidewater Tales is a 1987 novel by American writer John Barth. It tells the story of a married couple of storytellers, Peter Sagamore and Katherine Sherritt Sagamore, during the summer of 1980.

References

Fiction set in 1980
1987 American novels
Novels about writers
Novels by John Barth